The 1985 Giro d'Italia was the 68th edition of the Giro d'Italia, one of cycling's Grand Tours. The Giro began in Verona, with a prologue individual time trial on 16 May, and Stage 10 occurred on 27 May with a stage to Paola. The race finished in Lucca on 9 June.

Prologue
16 May 1985 — Verona,  (ITT)

Stage 1
17 May 1985 — Verona to Busto Arsizio,

Stage 2
18 May 1985 — Busto Arsizio to Milan,  (TTT)

Stage 3
19 May 1985 — Milan to Pinzolo,

Stage 4
20 May 1985 — Pinzolo to Selva di Val Gardena,

Stage 5
21 May 1985 — Selva di Val Gardena to Vittorio Veneto,

Stage 6
22 May 1985 — Vittorio Veneto to Cervia,

Stage 7
23 May 1985 — Cervia to Jesi,

Rest day
24 May 1985

Stage 8a
25 May 1985 — Foggia to Foggia,

Stage 8b
25 May 1985 — Foggia to Matera,

Stage 9
26 May 1985 — Matera to Crotone,

Stage 10
27 May 1985 — Crotone to Paola,

References

1985 Giro d'Italia
Giro d'Italia stages